The 1967 Rose Bowl was the 53rd edition of the college football bowl game, played at the Rose Bowl in Pasadena, California, on Monday, January 2. The game matched the #7 Purdue Boilermakers of the Big Ten Conference and the unranked USC Trojans of the AAWU (Pac-8). Purdue won 14−13, after USC scored a touchdown in the fourth quarter and opted to go for a two-point conversion to win the game, rather than kicking an extra point to tie.

Purdue defensive back John Charles was named the Player of the Game, and the attendance was 101,438. Because New Year's Day fell on Sunday in 1967, the game was played the next day.

Teams

Purdue Boilermakers

This was Purdue's first Rose Bowl appearance, and the seventh-ranked Boilermakers were led by All-American quarterback Bob Griese. The team earned their first trip to Pasadena with an  record ( in the Big Ten) and finished second in the Big Ten Conference. Purdue's only losses were to #1 Notre Dame and #2 Michigan State (who famously played to a tie on November 19). Purdue's only other appearance in the Rose Bowl was 34 years later, in January 2001.

USC Trojans

The AAWU (unofficially known as the Pac-8) champion Trojans came into the game with a  record ( in Pac-8), ranked in the second ten of the AP Poll and #18 in the UPI coaches poll. They were controversially awarded with the Rose Bowl bid over UCLA, despite the Bruins' #5 ranking,  record, and  victory over the Trojans. Because of a flaw in the schedule, USC played one more conference game than UCLA and had a 4–1 Pac-8 record to UCLA's . Prior to the UCLA-USC game, it was widely assumed that the winner would go to the Rose Bowl.

USC was voted in to the Rose Bowl by the AAWU athletic directors before prior to the game with Notre Dame on November 26, a 51–0 shutout loss in Los Angeles. Many thought awarding USC the Rose Bowl was to make up for 1964, when USC and Oregon State tied for the AAWU title. In that year, it was assumed that if USC upset #1 Notre Dame in its final game, they would get the nod over Oregon State. USC beat Notre Dame 20–17, but Oregon State was awarded the Rose Bowl berth over USC based on a tiebreaker of most recent Rose bowl appearance despite Oregon State's better overall record ( vs. ). The head coach of Oregon State in 1964 was Tommy Prothro, who left after the season for UCLA. Another factor may have been an ankle injury sustained by Bruin junior  quarterback Gary Beban, the Heisman Trophy winner in 1967. USC started the season with six wins, then dropped three of their last four games going into the matchup with Purdue. This was the first of four consecutive Rose Bowl appearances for the Trojans; the Pac-8 did not have a "no-repeat" rule.

Game summary
As 1967 was an odd-numbered year, the Athletic Association of Western Universities (AAWU) representative (USC) was designated the home team and wore cardinal red jerseys while Purdue, the visiting team, wore white jerseys with gold pants and helmets.

The game was a defensive struggle. Neither team scored in the first quarter and with each team reaching the end zone only once in the second quarter, the halftime score was 7–7. Purdue took a 14–7 lead in the third quarter after a touchdown run by fullback Perry Williams. With less than two minutes to play, USC scored a touchdown on a Troy Winslow pass to Rod Sherman for 19 yards. Coach John McKay decided to try for a two-point conversion to secure the win against the favored Boilermakers, but Purdue's George Catavolos intercepted the pass in the end zone to preserve the 14–13 victory.

Purdue's astronaut alumni (Neil Armstrong, Gene Cernan, Gus Grissom, and Roger Chaffee),  attended the 1967 Tournament of Roses Parade and Rose Bowl game. Less than four weeks later, Grissom and Chaffee died in the Apollo 1 fire in Florida.

Scoring

First quarter
 No scoring

Second quarter
 Purdue - Perry Williams 1-yard run (Bob Griese kick)
 USC - Don McCall 1-yard run (Tim Rossovich kick)

Third quarter
 Purdue - Williams 2-yard run (Griese kick)

Fourth quarter
 USC - Rod Sherman 19-yard pass from Troy Winslow (pass failed: interception)

References

Rose Bowl
Rose Bowl Game
Purdue Boilermakers football bowl games
USC Trojans football bowl games
Rose Bowl
January 1967 sports events in the United States